Eomyidae is a family of extinct rodents from North America and Eurasia related to modern day pocket gophers and kangaroo rats. They are known from the Middle Eocene to the Late Miocene in North America and from the Late Eocene to the Pleistocene in Eurasia. Eomyids were generally small, but occasionally large, and tended to be squirrel-like in form and habits. The family includes the earliest known gliding rodent, Eomys quercyi.

The family includes the following genera:
Simiacritomys (placement uncertain)
Symplokeomys
Subfamily Yoderimyinae
Litoyoderimys
Yoderimys
Zaisaneomys
Zemiodontomys
Subfamily Apeomyinae
Apeomyoides
Apeomys
Arikareeomys
Megapeomys
Zophoapeomys
Subfamily Eomyinae
Adjidaumo
Aguafriamys
Asianeomys
Aulolithomys
Centimanomys
Comancheomys
Cristadjidaumo
Cupressimus
Eomyodon
Eomyops
Eomys
Estramomys
Japaneomys
Kansasimys
Keramidomys
Leptodontomys
Ligerimys
Metadjidaumo
Metanoiamys
Meteomys
Montanamus
Namatomys
Neoadjidaumo
Orelladjidaumo
Paradjidaumo
Paranamatomys
Pentabuneomys
Protadjidaumo
Pseudadjidaumo
Pseudotheridomys
Rhodanomys
Ritteneria
Ronquillomys
Viejadjidaumo

References

Literature cited

Geomyoid rodents
Prehistoric rodent families
Eocene first appearances
Pleistocene extinctions
Taxa named by Herluf Winge